Ryan Looney (born November 8, 1975) is an American college basketball coach and the current Head Men's Basketball Coach at Idaho State University.

Coaching career 
Ryan Looney was formerly coach at Seattle Pacific University. 2013-14 SPU finished with an overall record of 26–6, won the Great Northwest Athletic Conference Championship, won the Great Northwest Athletic Conference Tournament Championship, reached as high as second in the NABC national poll, and advanced to the NCAA II National Tournament.  Looney was recognized as the 2014 GNAC Coach of the Year and the 2014 NABC West Region Coach of the Year.  During the 2012–13 season SPU finished with the best overall record in program history at 27–4, won the Great Northwest Athletic Conference Tournament Championship, reached as high as second in the NABC national poll, and advanced to the NCAA II West Region Final.<ref name=Lepse></</ref> In 2011-12 his team finished 23-8 overall and reached the Sweet 16 of the NCAA Division II National Tournament.  SPU compiled a 20–10 record in 2010-11 en route to an NCAA Division II Tournament berth. The Falcons were the Great Northwest Athletic Conference's last team standing in the 2010-11 playoffs after upsetting fifth ranked Central Washington 76-63 during a first-round game in Ellensburg. The Falcons accomplished that despite losing All-American point guard Chris Banchero to a mid-season knee injury. The 2009-10 West Region Player of the Year, Banchero was averaging 22.4 points and 5.6 assists per game before being sidelined for the final 19 games.

Looney led Seattle Pacific to a 22–6 record in 2009-10 and became the first coach to direct the Falcons to a conference championship in his inaugural season. Looney, who led his alma mater Eastern Oregon University to the quarterfinals of the 2009 NAIA Division II Tournament, was hired May 26, 2009 as the coach at SPU.<ref name="Seattle Times Staff"></</ref> He won his opening nine games on the SPU sidelines, the first coach to win more than his first three for the Falcons. Looney, 43, has a 330-131 (.716) career record, including a 164-51 (.763) at SPU.<ref name=Guptil></</ref>  He was voted the 2009-10 Great Northwest Athletic Conference Coach of the Year. Looney compiled a 97-53 (.647) record in five seasons with Eastern Oregon and directed EOU to back-to-back NAIA Tournament appearances in 2008 and 2009.

Looney and the Mountaineers had a breakout season in 2005–06, which produced the best record at EOU since 1969.  The season was the second largest turnaround in school history.  The 2005-06 Mountaineers also notched some memorable victories as well. During the 2006–07 season the Mountaineers finished with an overall record of 23–8, advanced to the finals of the 2007 Cascade Collegiate Conference Tournament, and were ranked as high as 17th in the NAIA national poll.  The 2007-08 Mountaineers put together the most memorable season in program history.  They finished with an overall record of 26–6, won the school's first conference championship in 38 years, advanced to the NAIA National Tournament for the first time in school history, and were ranked as high as third in the NAIA national poll.  For his efforts Looney was recognized as the 2007-08 Cascade Collegiate Conference Men's Basketball Coach of the Year.  The 2008-09 Mountaineers did not disappoint either.  They finished with an overall record of 25–8, won the Cascade Collegiate Conference Championship, advanced to the Elite Eight of the NAIA National Basketball Tournament, and were ranked as high as sixth in the NAIA national poll.

Looney was named the 10th Head Men's Basketball Coach at Eastern Oregon University in May 2004.  He came to LaGrande after two seasons as the top assistant at NCAA Division II Minnesota State University Moorhead. After graduating from EOU with a Bachelor of Science in Liberal Studies, Looney spent two seasons as a graduate assistant at NCAA Division III University of Wisconsin-La Crosse.  While at UWL, Looney also obtained a Master of Science in Athletic Administration.

Ryan is married to former EOU cross country and track & field standout Julianna Morris.  The two have a daughter Peyton Danielle Looney and a son Micah J. Looney.

Head coaching record

References

External links 
  Seattle Pacific University
  Great Northwest Athletic Conference
  Eastern Oregon University
  Seattle Times
  Cascade Collegiate Conference
  Oregonian
  USA Today
  Point Loma Nazarene University
  Seattle Times

1975 births
Living people
American men's basketball coaches
American men's basketball players
Basketball coaches from Washington (state)
Basketball players from Spokane, Washington
College men's basketball head coaches in the United States
Eastern Oregon Mountaineers men's basketball coaches
Eastern Oregon Mountaineers men's basketball players
High school basketball coaches in the United States
Point Loma Nazarene Sea Lions men's basketball coaches
Seattle Pacific Falcons men's basketball coaches